Different Strokes is an album by Jim Hoiles & Friends, Alison Krauss & Swamp Weiss. It also features bassist Viktor Krauss, brother of bluegrass singer and violinist Alison Krauss. Released in 1986, the album is a collection of traditional Bluegrass fiddle tunes.

Track listing
All tracks are Traditional
 "Sally Goodin'"
 "One Hundred Pipers"
 "Swamp's Reel"
 "Dusty Miller"
 "Nate's Waltz"
 "Go Hither to Go Yonder"
 "Grey Eagle"
 "Morrison's Reel"
 "Song for Norman"
 "Nick's Noodle"
 "Stack of Barley"
 "Daybreak in Dixie"

Personnel
 Viktor Krauss – bass
 Alison Krauss – fiddle, vocals
 Bruce Weiss – guitar
 Jim Hoiles – fiddle

References

1985 debut albums
Alison Krauss & Union Station albums
Rounder Records albums